Amar (also Romanized as ʿAmār (3)) is a village in Chahdegal Rural District, Negin Kavir District, Fahraj County, Kerman Province, Iran. At the 2006 census, its population was 22, in 4 families.

References 

Populated places in Fahraj County